Gay Nazis may refer to:
Gay skinhead 
National Socialist League (United States), a neo-Nazi gay organization
Racism in the LGBT community
Gay fascism, the theory that homosexuals caused Nazism